Beyond Ynth is a mobile, casual game for iOS and Android, developed by German studio FDG Entertainment, and released on September 10, 2010.

Critical reception
The game has a Metacritic score of 87% based on 7 critic reviews.

References

2010 video games
Android (operating system) games
IOS games
Puzzle video games
Video games developed in Germany